= Ashraf Kadakkal =

Ashraf Kadakkal is an Indian Islamist Intellectual, Islamic historian and author who has attracted media attention for his opinion and stand on the influence of salafism among Kerala Muslims. Ashraf Kadakkal who is an alumnus of the prestigious Jawaharlal Nehru University Delhi, teaches Islamic history at Kerala University. He is also the author of the Malayalam language book Sacharinte Keralaparisaram. He is the son of Muslim Priest Kadakkal Abdul Aziz Moulavi.
